A list of countries by health insurance coverage. The table lists the percentage of the total population covered by total public and primary private health insurance, by government/social health insurance, and by primary private health insurance, including 34 members of Organisation for Economic Co-operation and Development (OECD) member countries.